Platytachina is a genus of parasitic flies in the family Tachinidae. There are about five described species in Platytachina.

Species
These five species belong to the genus Platytachina:
 Platytachina angustifrons Malloch, 1938
 Platytachina atricornis Malloch, 1938
 Platytachina difficilis Malloch, 1938
 Platytachina latifrons Malloch, 1938
 Platytachina major Malloch, 1938

References

Further reading

 
 
 
 

Tachinidae
Articles created by Qbugbot